The Mysterious Joker anime television series is based on manga series of the same name written and illustrated by Hideyasu Takahashi. The anime is produced by Asatsu DK, animated by Shin-Ei Animation, and is directed by Yukiyo Teramoto. The series was broadcast on Tokyo MX in Japan since October 6, 2014, and has also aired on Kids Station since October 16, 2014. The series is simulcasted by Crunchyroll under the title Joker. The series' opening theme is "Kaitō Miracle Shōnen Boy" (怪盗ミラクル少年ボーイ Phantom Thief Miracle Young Boy) by Aruka Rider, and the ending theme is "Parade Illusion" (パレード・イリュージョン) by Mainya with Shuffle Sisters.

Episodes

Season 1 (2014-2015)

Season 2 (2015)

Season 3 (2016)

Season 4 (2016)

References

External links
 Full episode list

Mysterious Joker